The Charleston–Mattoon, IL Micropolitan Statistical Area, as defined by the United States Census Bureau, is an area consisting of two counties in central Illinois, anchored by the cities of Charleston and Mattoon.

As of the 2000 census, the area had a population of 64,449 (though a July 1, 2009 estimate placed the population at 62,781).

Counties
Coles
Cumberland

Communities

Places with more than 20,000 inhabitants

Places with 10,000 to 20,000 inhabitants
Mattoon (Principal city)
Charleston (Principal city)

Places with 1,000 to 10,000 inhabitants
Casey (partial)
Greenup
Neoga
Toledo

Places with 500 to 1,000 inhabitants
Ashmore
Oakland

Places with less than 500 inhabitants
Humboldt
Lerna
Montrose (partial)
Jewett

Unincorporated places
Etna
Loxa

Townships

Coles County
 Ashmore Township
 Charleston Township
 East Oakland Township
 Humboldt Township
 Hutton Township
 Lafayette Township
 Mattoon Township
 Morgan Township
 North Okaw Township
 Paradise Township
 Pleasant Grove Township
 Seven Hickory Township

Cumberland County
 Cottonwood Township
 Crooked Creek Township
 Greenup Township
 Neoga Township
 Spring Point Township
 Sumpter Township
 Union Township
 Woodbury Township

Demographics
As of the census of 2000, there were 64,449 people, 25,411 households, and 15,161 families residing within the μSA. The racial makeup of the μSA was 95.98% White, 1.90% African American, 0.20% Native American, 0.68% Asian, 0.04% Pacific Islander, 0.38% from other races, and 0.82% from two or more races. Hispanic or Latino of any race were 1.25% of the population.

The median income for a household in the μSA was $44,206, and the median income for a family was $49,576. Males had a median income of $31,804 versus $20,965 for females. The per capita income for the μSA was $17,162.

See also
Illinois statistical areas

References

 
Geography of Coles County, Illinois
Geography of Cumberland County, Illinois
Micropolitan areas of Illinois